Diuris corymbosa, commonly called the common donkey orchid or wallflower orchid, is a species of orchid which is endemic to the south-west of Western Australia. It is similar to the purple pansy orchid (Diuris longifolia) but its flowers are yellow rather than purple or mauve and it flowers earlier in the year. It also resembles the winter donkey orchid (Diuris brumalis) but flowers later than that species. It is one of the most common orchid species in the Perth area, often forms extensive colonies and usually has numerous flowers on the one spike.

Description
The flowers have long, wide donkey ear-like petals, a short, wide erect dorsal sepal and narrow, hanging, sometimes crossed lateral sepals. The labellum has three lobes, the lateral ones broad and spreading and the middle lobe short, inverted V-shaped or flattened. Flowering occurs from September, sometimes August, to October.

Taxonomy and naming
Diuris corymbosa was first formally described in 1840 by John Lindley and the description was published in A Sketch of the Vegetation of the Swan River Colony as an appendix to Edwards's Botanical Register. The specific epithet (corymbosa) is derived from the Latin word corymbus meaning "a bunch of flowers" and the suffix -osus meaning "an abundance of", referring to the flower clusters of this species.

Distribution and habitat
Common donkey orchid occurs between Dongara and Albany where it grows in woodland, often on the margins of swamps.

Conservation
Diuris corymbosa is classified as "not threatened" by the Western Australian Government Department of Parks and Wildlife.

References

corymbosa
Endemic orchids of Australia
Orchids of Western Australia
Endemic flora of Western Australia
Plants described in 1840